A Busshi (仏師) is a Japanese sculptor specializing in Buddha statues.

List of Busshi 
 Chōkai (ja)
 Chōsei (ja)
 Eikai (ja)
 Enkū
 Ensei (ja)
 Genkei (ja)
 Gyōkai (ja)
 Higo Bettō Jōkei (ja)
 Inchō (ja)
 Injo (ja)
 Inkaku (ja)
 Inkichi (ja)
 Inson (ja)
 Jōchō
 Jōkaku (ja)
 Jōkei
 Kaikei
 Kakuen (ja)
 Kakujo (ja)
 Kōben (ja)
 Kōkei
 Kōchō (ja)
 Kōjo (ja)
 Kochi no Obinari (ja)
 Kōshō (ja)
 Kōshō (ja)
 Kōun (ja)
 Kuninaka no Kimimaro (ja)
 Matsumoto Myōkei (ja)
 Myōen (ja)
 Raijo (ja)
 Seichō (ja)
 Tankei
 Tori Busshi
 Unga (ja)
 Unjo (ja)
 Unkei
 Yamaguchi no Ōguchi (ja)
 Zen'en (善円) or Zenkei (ja)
 Zenshun (ja)
 Zenzō (ja)

Japanese sculptors
Buddhist art